Grégory Gachet (born 9 December 1976) is a French ski mountaineer.

Gachet was born in Beaufort, Savoie. He is member of the Club Multisports Arêches-Beaufort and has been member of the national selection since 2002. In 2011, he married Gabrielle Magnenat.

Selected results 
 2004:
 7th, World Championship single race
 2005:
 1st, World Cup team race in Salt Lake City (together with Florent Perrier)
 1st, European Championship team race (together with Florent Perrier)
 4th, European Championship single race
 4th, European Championship relay race (together with Florent Perrier, Bertrand Blanc and Tony Sbalbi)
 2006:
 2nd, World Championship team race (together with Florent Perrier)
 2nd, World Championship relay race (together with Stéphane Brosse, Florent Perrier and Patrick Blanc)
 2007:
 1st, European Championship team race (together with Florent Perrier)
 2nd, Tour du Rutor race
 4th, European Championship combination ranking
 6th, European Championship single race
 2008:
 1st, French Championship team race
 3rd, World Championship vertical race
 3rd, World Championship combination ranking
 4th, World Championship team race (together with William Bon Mardion)
 5th, World Championship single race
 2009:
 4th, European Championship team race (together with Yannick Buffet)
 5th, European Championship vertical race
 5th, European Championship combination ranking
 10th, European Championship single race
 2010:
 3rd, World Championship relay race (together with Didier Blanc, Florent Perrier and William Bon Mardion)
 7th, World Championship team race (together with Tony Sbalbi)
 10th, World Championship vertical race

Pierra Menta 

 2001: 8th, together with Emmanuel Blanc
 2003: 7th, together with Emmanuel Blanc
 2005: 2nd, together with Florent Perrier
 2007: 1st, together with Florent Perrier
 2008: 4th, together with William Bon Mardion
 2009: 6th, together with Alexandre Pellicier

Trofeo Mezzalama 

 2003: 7th, together with Bertrand Blanc and Cyril Champange
 2007: 2nd, together with Florent Perrier and Patrick Blanc
 2011: 6th, together with Xavier Gachet and Alexis Sévennec-Verdier

External links
 Grégory Gachet at skimountaineering.org

References 

1976 births
Living people
French male ski mountaineers
Sportspeople from Savoie
20th-century French people
21st-century French people